Cygnus paloregonus is a fossil swan. It is an ancestor of, and distantly allied to, the mute swan. It is known from the Pleistocene from Fossil Lake, Oregon, Froman's Ferry, Idaho, and from Arizona. It is referred to by Hildegarde Howard in Delacour's The Waterfowl of the World as "probably the mute type swan".

See also 
 List of fossil bird genera

References

External links 

Pleistocene birds of North America
†paloregonus
Birds described in 1878
Fossil taxa described in 1878
Fossils of the United States